Nicole Muñoz (born June 24, 1994) is a Canadian film and television actress. She is known for her roles as Kelly in the film The Tooth Fairy, as Young Cody in the film Fetching Cody, and for her role as Christie Tarr (née McCawley) in the Syfy television series Defiance. In 2019, Muñoz began starring as Jack in season 4 of Syfy series Van Helsing.

Early and personal life
Muñoz was born in Vancouver, British Columbia to a Spanish father and Québécois mother. She has two sisters, Britta and Sophia. She moved to Toronto when she was cast in Defiance at age 18.

Career
Muñoz has over 60 commercial spots and 40 film and TV credits to her name. She made her television debut in an episode of Jeremiah. She also made guest appearances on many TV shows including, Da Vinci's Inquest, Tru Calling, Stephen King's Dead Zone, Stargate: Atlantis and Supernatural. She got her first recurring role in  2009 in the space travel, television science fiction drama series, Defying Gravity playing a Palestinian girl. Between 2006-2007, she appeared in 4 made-for-television movies as well. In 2009, she made a guest appearance on Syfy series, Sanctuary episode, Pavor Nocturnus playing Jessica Mitchell, a young girl lost in a post-apocalyptic world.

Muñoz has also played small roles in big-budget movies shot in Canada including Fantastic Four, Pathfinder, Another Cinderella Story, Center Stage: Turn It Up and the Dwayne Johnson starrer, Tooth Fairy. Her other films include HBO thriller Imaginary Playmate, and The Last Mimzy, for which she was one of the nominees for the 29th Young Artist Awards category, Best Performance by a Young Ensemble Cast. In mid-2012, she was cast in Defiance in a recurring role. In 2016 Muñoz was cast opposite Laurie Holden in Pywacket, an occult movie directed by  Adam MacDonald.

In 2019, Muñoz began starring as Jack in season 4 of Syfy series Van Helsing.

Filmography

Film

Television

References

External links

1994 births
Actresses from Vancouver
Canadian child actresses
Canadian film actresses
Canadian television actresses
Canadian people of Spanish descent
Living people
21st-century Canadian actresses